These are the Billboard Hot Dance/Disco Club Play and Maxi-Singles Sales number-one hits of 1995.

See also
1995 in music
List of number-one dance hits (United States)
List of artists who reached number one on the U.S. Dance chart

References

1995
United States dance singles
1995 in American music